Ella Claridge is an English cricketer who currently plays for Buckinghamshire, The Blaze and Trent Rockets. She plays as a right-handed batter and wicket-keeper.

Domestic career
Claridge made her county debut in 2017, for Buckinghamshire against Cambridgeshire and Huntingdonshire, in which she top-scored with 57 from 52 balls in a 79-run victory. The following season, 2018, she was Buckinghamshire's leading run-scorer in the Twenty20 Cup, with 196 runs including two half-centuries, both against Dorset. Claridge was again Buckinghamshire's leading run-scorer in the 2019 Women's Twenty20 Cup, with 100 runs, including 51 made against Lincolnshire. Claridge's 166 runs in the 2021 Women's Twenty20 Cup again made her Buckinghamshire's leading run-scorer for the competition, including two half-centuries, made against Norfolk and Huntingdonshire. She was again Buckinghamshire's leading run-scorer in the 2022 Women's Twenty20 Cup, with 199 runs at an average of 24.87. Against Huntingdonshire, Claridge made her Twenty20 high score, scoring 96 from 61 deliveries.

In 2021, Claridge was included in Lightning's Academy squad for the season. She was also included in the Trent Rockets squad for the 2021 season, but did not play a match. Claridge made her debut for the senior Lightning team on 28 August 2021, in a Charlotte Edwards Cup match against Central Sparks. She appeared three times for the side in the Rachael Heyhoe Flint Trophy later that season, scoring 46 runs including 39* made against Western Storm. She played six matches for Lightning in 2022, across the Charlotte Edwards Cup and the Rachael Heyhoe Flint Trophy, scoring 118 runs with a top score of 41. She was also once again part of the Trent Rockets squad for The Hundred, but did not play a match.

References

External links

2002 births
Living people
Sportspeople from Aylesbury
Buckinghamshire women cricketers
The Blaze women's cricketers